The list of ship commissionings in 1994 includes a chronological list of all ships commissioned in 1994.


See also 

1994